The Portsmouth Lillies minor league baseball team played in Portsmouth, New Hampshire, for part of one season in 1888. The Lillies replaced a team from Portland, Maine, on July 20, 1888. They played in the New England League, which was a group of minor league baseball teams from 1886 to 1949.

The Lillies were managed to a record of 12 wins and 20 losses by Frank Leonard.

References

Defunct minor league baseball teams
Portsmouth, New Hampshire
Rockingham County, New Hampshire
Professional baseball teams in New Hampshire
Defunct baseball teams in New Hampshire
New England League teams
Baseball teams disestablished in 1888
Baseball teams established in 1888